Horace Austin Warner "Haw" Tabor (November 26, 1830 – April 10, 1899), also known as The Bonanza King of Leadville and The Silver King, was an American prospector, businessman, and Republican politician. His success in Leadville, Colorado's silver mines made him one of the wealthiest men in Colorado. He purchased more mining enterprises throughout Colorado and the Southwestern United States, and he was a philanthropist. After the collapse in the silver market during the Panic of 1893, Tabor was financially devastated. He lost most of his holdings, and he labored in the mines. In his last year, he was the postmaster of Denver.

While married to Augusta Tabor, he had an affair with Elizabeth McCourt Tabor. He divorced Augusta and married Elizabeth, who became known as "Baby Doe". Their relationship was a scandal. When Tabor died, though, there were a reported ten thousand people who attended his funeral.

His life is the subject of Douglas Moore's opera The Ballad of Baby Doe and the 1932 Hollywood biographical movie
Silver Dollar. Also, Graham Masterton's 1987 novel Silver has a protagonist named Henry T. Roberts, whose life includes incidents from Tabor's.

Early life 
Horace Austin Warner Tabor was born on November 26, 1830 to Cornelius Dunham and Sarah Ferrin Tabor in Holland, in northern Vermont near the Canadian border. His father was a farmer, who grew a number of grains, vegetables and fruits. In the winter months, Cornelius ran the district school, and Tabor attended the school over those couple of months each year. Tabor worked in the fields with his father and his brothers John and Lyman. They also raised cows, sheep, chickens and hogs. He had two sisters, Sarah and Emily. The family lived in a drafty house without conveniences, such as water, electricity or a proper stove. In the fields, they used primitive tools that required labor by man or oxen. His mother died in 1846 at the age of 49, having succumbed to the hard work on the farm and childbearing. Cornelius soon remarried. By 1850, Betsy Tabor was his wife and five children with the Welch surname, from 11 to 19 years of age, lived with the Tabors in Holland, Vermont.

At the age of 17, Tabor worked for two years as an apprentice in Quincy or Boston, Massachusetts with his brother John, where they worked as granite cutters. Then he began to work as a journeyman throughout New England. In 1853, he was hired by a stone contractor, William Pierce, from Augusta, Maine to supervise stone-cutters in the construction of an insane asylum in Augusta. Tabor met Pierce's daughter, Augusta, and fell in love with her, but was unable to support a wife yet.

Kansas abolitionist and legislator

Among the events leading up to the Civil War (1861-1865), there was a fight over what states and new territories would support slavery or not. At the same time, the California Gold Rush resulted in a lot of people moving west and the railroads helped get them there. The Kansas–Nebraska Act, which created the Kansas and Nebraska Territories, passed quickly by House of Representatives and the Senate and was swiftly enacted by President Franklin Pierce. The act repealed the Missouri Compromise which aggravated the dissension between pro-slavery and anti-slavery Americans.

Tabor and Augusta made a plan to ready themselves for marriage. Tabor would travel ahead to westward, get established, save some money, and return to Maine to marry Augusta. Together they would return to Kansas where they would fight for the abolition of slavery.

In 1855, Tabor departed with his brother John for the Kansas Territory with the New England Emigrant Aid Company to populate that territory with anti-slavery settlers.  He worked at Fort Riley as a stonemason to earn enough money to get married. 

He joined with other abolitionists, including John Brown, the abolitionist who later led the raid on Harper's Ferry, to defend the town of Lawrence against pro-slavery men, which resulted in  the Sacking of Lawrence.

A member of the Free Soil Party, Tabor was elected to the Topeka Legislature, but that body was soon dispersed by President Pierce at the point of a bayonet.

Marriage to Augusta Pierce Tabor

Tabor married Augusta Pierce, the daughter of Lucy and William Pierce, on January 31, 1857. After their marriage at her family's home in Maine, the couple farmed for two years along Deep Creek in Zeandale, Kansas (known today as Tabor Valley). They had a son named Nathaniel Maxcy, who was also known as Maxey.

Pike's Peak Gold Rush

In 1859, the Tabors moved west during the Pike's Peak Gold Rush with other "Fifty-Niners" to Denver (in Kansas Territory at the time). Tabor, his wife, and son were tranported by an oxen-driven covered wagon. After the six-week journey, they arrived in Colorado in April 1859. They were among the initial pioneers in what is now the state of Colorado. They went to several places looking to mine gold before going to California Gulch in Oro City, near present-day Leadville, in 1860. They began placer mining, and operated a small store there, but by 1861 the area was panned out.

They moved to Park County, settling in Laurette in South Park by 1862. The town of Laurette was later called Buckskin Joe. They operated a store and beginning in 1863 Tabor was the postmaster of Buckskin Joe. Tabor prospected area mines while Augusta ran the store, took in laundry, and cared for boarders. Augusta, one of the few women in the state at the time, made most of the money for the family by operating the store, boarding people, cooking and managing the mail. Called an "angel of mercy", she also cared for her neighbors. In 1863, the family's net worth was approximately $13,000. Augusta managed their bookkeeping. She felt that the area was safe and invited her unmarried sister Lillian Pierce to join them in Buckskin Joe. Lillian arrived by April 22, 1862.

They left the area in 1868, upon hearing that there was a massive silver lode at the Printer Boy Mine in Oro City, which became part of Leadville in 1877. The Tabors moved there, where they operated a general store and Tabor was again a postmaster from April 1, 1878 to February 4, 1879. 

In 1877, Tabor was elected the first mayor of Leadville. Tabor hired lawman Mart Duggan, who is credited with finally bringing Leadville's violent crime rate under control.

Silver King

When George T. Hook and August Rische were unable to pay for their supplies at the general store, Tabor accepted payment in the form of a grubstake agreement for one third of their profit on the Little Pittsburg mine. Tabor entered into a number of grubstake agreements with the prospectors, knowing he would receive no monies if they did not make money on the mine. Augusta strongly disagreed with this approach, she felt that they should save their money. On May 3, 1878, the mine revealed massive silver lodes and kicked off the Colorado Silver Boom.  Tabor used the million dollars that he made from the sale of his interest in the Little Pittsburg mine in 1879 to invest in other holdings. He invested in the Chrysotile and the Matchless Mines, as well as mines in Cripple Creek, Aspen, the San Juan Mountains, and the southwestern United States. By 1879, he was one of the richest men in Colorado, with six million or more dollars.

Tabor owned 4,600,000 acres of land in Colorado for grazing and 175,000 acres of land in Texas for copper mining. He sought enterprises, like irrigation canals, to provide work for laborers. In Honduras, he invested in ebony and mahogoney forests as well as mining and fruit operations.

In Leadville, he donated monies for water works, rail lines, schools, and churches. He established newspapers, a bank, and the Tabor Opera House in Leadville. He displayed his philanthropy by, for example, donating the land under the Temple Israel in Leadville in 1884. Tabor donated the money for the Tabor Grand Opera House built the Tabor Block and La Veta Place, and invested in real estate and other businesses in Denver. Tabor became a partner of Marshall Field of Chicago, with whom he made millions of dollars.

In 1878, Tabor was elected Lieutenant Governor of Colorado and served in that post until January 1884. He served as U.S. Senator from January 27, 1883 until March 3, 1883, following the resignation of Henry M. Teller to become United States Secretary of the Interior in the administration of U.S. President Chester Arthur. He was the president of the Denver Chamber of Commerce and of the Board of
Trade in 1891.

Divorce
In 1879, the Tabors moved to Denver. Tabor's relationship with his wife, who preferred to save their money, began to fall as Tabor became a reckless spender and he continued to be a gambler and speculator. The couple then lived in separate residences, Augusta resided in their Denver mansion. Tabor moved into the Windsor Hotel in the city, where he entertained women. He had an affair with Elizabeth McCourt, nicknamed Baby Doe. Requiring money to support herself, by 1882 she took in boarders and she filed a suit against Tabor for financial support. Without Augusta's knowledge, Tabor attained a divorce in Durango, Colorado in March 1882. Augusta filed for divorce on January 2, 1883 for desertion. Settle in late 1883, she was awarded two properties worth a total of $250,000 or a settlement of $400,000.

Marriage to Elizabeth Doe McCourt

On March 1, 1883, Tabor finally legalized his relationship with Elizabeth "Baby Doe" McCourt in Washington, D.C.. The marriage made Tabor a social outcast.  The second marriage produced two daughters, Elizabeth Bonduel "Lily" and Rosemary "Silver Dollar" Echo. The Tabors lived a life of luxury and travelled.

Later years and death

Tabor ran without success for governor of Colorado throughout the 1880s. Then, in 1893, the repeal of the Sherman Silver Purchase Act in the administration of President Grover Cleveland, caused the value of silver to drop which devastated Tabor's fortune. His holdings, including his mansion in Denver, were sold off and he worked in the mines. He was made postmaster of Denver in 1898 and lived in the city at the Windsor Hotel.

When he became terminally ill with appendicitis in 1899, Tabor's final request of Baby Doe was that she maintain the Matchless claim. Following his death, flags were flown at half staff and the Aspen Tribune reported that ten thousand people attended his funeral. His body was interred at Mt. Calvary Cemetery in Denver and was later reinterred at Mt. Olivet Cemetery in Jefferson County, Colorado.

Baby Doe moved to Leadville and lived an impoverished life in the tool shed of the Matchless Mine. She froze to death in the shed in March 1935, after which she was buried alongside her husband in Mt. Olivet Cemetery.

Augusta Tabor fared better than her ex-husband. She made successful investments of her divorce settlement. On her death in 1895, she was among the wealthiest citizens of Denver, leaving half a million dollars to her son.

Legacy
He was a prominent silver baron who "helped shape the foundation and the future of the Centennial State."

In his remembrance, there is a Tabor Lake in Pitkin County, Colorado at the base of Tabor Peak.

His life is portrayed in the film ''Silver Dollar and the opera The Ballad of Baby Doe.

Notes

References

Bibliography
 
  For more information about the documentary, see IMDB.

Further reading

External links
 
 

1830 births
1899 deaths
Colorado Mining Boom
Lieutenant Governors of Colorado
People from Orleans County, Vermont
American prospectors
American miners
Mayors of places in Colorado
People from Leadville, Colorado
People from Park County, Colorado
People from Denver
Colorado postmasters
Colorado Republicans
Republican Party United States senators from Colorado
Society of Colorado Pioneers
American city founders
Deaths from appendicitis
Kansas Republicans
People of the American Old West
19th-century American politicians